Green Bay is the name of two bays in the Canadian province of Newfoundland and Labrador.

On Newfoundland, Green Bay is a natural bay located on the eastern side of the Baie Verte Peninsula. Communities located in Green Bay are: Burlington, Harry's Harbour, Jackson's Cove, King's Point, Little Bay, Middle Arm, Nicky's Nose Cove, Rattling Brook and Smith's Harbour.
On the south coast of Labrador, Green Bay is a naturally wooded bay on the north shore of the Strait of Belle Isle.

Bays of Newfoundland and Labrador